This is a list of events related to British television in 1938.

Events

January
No events.

February
21 February – The BBC Television Service broadcasts the first ever piece of television science-fiction, a 35-minute adaptation of a segment of the play R.U.R. by the Czech playwright Karel Čapek.

March
12 March – First news bulletin carried by the BBC Television Service, in sound only. Previously, the service had aired British Movietone News cinema newsreels.

April
1 April – The Oxford and Cambridge Boat Race is first televised on the BBC Television Service.
19 April – The first televised football (soccer) match, England v Scotland, shown on the BBC Television Service.
30 April – The FA Cup Final is televised for the first time on the BBC Television Service.

May
31 May – The first quiz show, Spelling Bee, is televised on the BBC Television Service.

June
24 June 
Test Match Cricket is broadcast for the first time on the BBC Television Service, with coverage of the second test of The Ashes series between England and Australia, live from Lord's Cricket Ground.
John Logie Baird gives the world's first public demonstration of a colour television broadcast. The 120-line image is projected at the Dominion Theatre, London on a 12 by 9 feet (3.7 by 2.7 m) screen in front of an audience of 3,000.

July – December
By the end of the year 9,315 television sets have been sold in England.

Debuts
11 February – R.U.R (1938)
19 February – Clive of India (1938)
1 April – The Boat Race (1938–1939, 1946–2019)
8 May – Checkmate (1938)
11 May – The Emperor Jones (1938)
31 May – The Constant Nymph (1938)
10 August – Telecrime (1938–1939, 1946)
31 May – Spelling Bee (1938)
July – Ann and Harold (1938)
2 July – On the Spot (1938)
5 July – White Secrets (1939)
12 July – The Case of the Frightened Lady (1938)
30 October – Cyrano de Bergerac (1938)
31 October – Smoky Cell (1938)
1 November – The Last Voyage of Captain Grant (1938)
7 November – The Breadwinner (1938)
10 November – Villa For Sale (1938)
11 November – The White Chateau (1938)
23 November – Love from a Stranger (1938)

Continuing television shows

1920s
BBC Wimbledon (1927–1939, 1946–2019, 2021–2024)

1930s
Picture Page (1936–1939, 1946–1952)
The Disorderly Room (1937–1939)
For the Children (1937–1939, 1946–1952)

Ending this year
 Ann and Harold (1938)

Births

 14 March – Eleanor Bron, actress and author
 6 April – Paul Daniels, magician and television performer (d. 2016)
 20 April – Peter Snow, radio and television presenter
 28 April – Fred Dibnah, steeplejack and television personality (d. 2004)
 7 June – Ian St John, Scottish footballer and TV pundit (d. 2021)
 20 July – Diana Rigg, actress (d. 2020)
 22 July – Terence Stamp, actor
 28 July – Ian McCaskill, weatherman (d. 2016)
 3 August – Terry Wogan, Irish broadcaster (d. 2016)
 31 August – Martin Bell, war correspondent, independent politician and UNICEF ambassador
 12 September
 Michael Leader, actor (d. 2016)
 Patrick Mower, actor 
 22 October – Derek Jacobi, actor
 28 October – David Dimbleby, political broadcaster

See also
 1938 in British music
 1938 in the United Kingdom
 List of British films of 1938

Notes